RushOrderTees is a technology and custom apparel company based in Philadelphia. Eighty percent of its two hundred and fifty employees are millennials.

History 
Coming from a family of entrepreneurs, RushOrderTees began in 2002 in Philadelphia with Michael, Jordan and Alexis Nemeroff serving as its founders. They started the company with one machine and one heater in their parents' garage, while attending Lower Moreland High School. The company's first website originated as a school project. Michael Nemeroff attributes the growth of RushOrderTees to individuals who were dissatisfied with other businesses in the same field. As such, RushOrderTees became popular among individuals who needed bespoke clothing by a deadline. In April 2018 RushOrderTees acquired the design firm Tonic Design based in Callowhill.

Activities 

RushOrderTees currently occupies a 63,000 square foot t-shirt printing and embroidery facility in Philadelphia. The company has a revenue of $22.9 million USD as of 2015. It serves as an official apparel provider for the Philadelphia 76ers with which it has entered a partnership. This partnership has included the distribution of Philadelphia 76ers and Philadelphia Eagles t-shirts for the Super Bowl LII.

Philanthropy 
RushOrderTees has partnered with local Philadelphia based eateries in order to distribute clothing to the homeless. The tags within the apparel for the poor included "homeless resources in the city, such as free shelter, food, and a free computer lab."

For each yard the Philadelphia Eagles advanced on 4 February 2018 during Super Bowl LII, RushOrderTees donated three products to Covenant House.

After Hurricane Harvey struck down in Texas, RushOrderTees dispatched "uniforms for tens of thousands claims adjusters who were descending on the Houston area".

See also 

 Cafe Press
 CustomInk
 Redbubble
 Shopify
 Shutterfly
 Spreadshirt
 TeePublic
 Teespring
 Vistaprint
 Zazzle

References

External links 
Rush Order Tees (Official Website)
Custom Superbowl T-Shirts at Rush Order Tees - Fox News

Clothing companies of the United States
Clothing companies established in 2002
Technology companies established in 2002
Companies based in Philadelphia
2002 establishments in Pennsylvania